The Devil's Hour is a British drama thriller television series created by Tom Moran, and executive produced by Steven Moffat through his production company Hartswood Films. The series consists of six episodes, and premiered on 28 October 2022 on Amazon Prime Video. In November 2022, the series was renewed for a second and third season.

Plot
Lucy is a social worker dealing with family and relationships woes. She wakes every night at exactly 3:33 AM, after experiencing terrifying visions during the so-called devil's hour between 3 AM and 4 AM. Her eight-year-old son is withdrawn and emotionless. Her mother speaks to empty chairs. Her house is haunted by the echoes of a life that is not her own. Lucy's name is inexplicably connected to a string of brutal murders in the area, and she is drawn into the hunt for a serial killer.

Cast and characters 

 Jessica Raine as Lucy Chambers, a social worker suffering from insomnia
 Peter Capaldi as Gideon Shepherd, a mysterious criminal who has a unique relationship with time
 Nikesh Patel as DI Ravi Dhillon, a detective with haemophobia
 Alex Ferns as DS Nick Holness, Dhillon's partner and colleague 
 Meera Syal as Dr Ruby Bennett, a child psychologist treating Isaac
 Barbara Marten as Sylvia Chambers, Lucy's mother who suffers from dementia and schizophrenia 
 Phil Dunster as Mike Stevens, Lucy's estranged husband and Isaac's father
 Benjamin Chivers as Isaac Stevens, Lucy and Mike's emotionally troubled son

Episodes

Production

Development 
In December 2019, it was announced Tom Moran was developing The Devil's Hour for Amazon. In June 2021, it was announced Amazon had greenlit the series. The series is written, created, and executive produced by Tom Moran. Steven Moffat and Sue Vertue also executive produce the series. The series is produced by Hartswood Films. Johnny Allan and Isabelle Sieb were set to direct episodes of the series.

Casting 
In mid-June 2021, Jessica Raine and Peter Capaldi were cast as the leads. Nikesh Patel, Meera Syal, Alex Ferns, Phil Dunster, Barbara Marten, Thomas Dominique, Rhiannon Harper-Rafferty, John Alastair, Sandra Huggett, and Benjamin Chivers were also cast.

Title sequence 
The title sequence is a stylised interpretation of a 'vortex', featuring kaleidoscopic effects and bright colour overlays. It was made in London by Peter Anderson Studio.

Casting 
In mid-June 2021, Jessica Raine and Peter Capaldi were cast as the leads. Nikesh Patel, Meera Syal, Alex Ferns, Phil Dunster, Barbara Marten, Thomas Dominique, Rhiannon Harper-Rafferty, John Alastair, Sandra Huggett, and Benjamin Chivers were also cast.

Music 
The series' score is composed by The Newton Brothers, and the soundtrack album was released on October 28, the same day as the series release.

Release 
The Devil's Hour premiered on 28 October 2022 on Amazon Prime Video, and consists of six episodes.

Reception
On Rotten Tomatoes 100% of 17 critic reviews are positive, with an average rating of 7/10. On Metacritic it has a score of 71 based on reviews from 5 critics, indicating "generally favorable reviews".

Lucy Mangan of The Guardian awarded the first episode four stars out of five, praising Raine and Capaldi's performances. Amanda Whiting of The Independent gave the first two episodes four out of five stars, dubbing it "haunting". Jasper Rees of The Daily Telegraph gave it three stars, remarking that "There’s certainly pleasure to be had from the denouement, and from Raine’s protean turn as the figure trapped in a horror mystery. But some may find that gratification is too teasingly postponed." Martin Carr of the Radio Times also gave it three stars, stating, "The Devil's Hour fails to concisely pull all its puzzle pieces together and satisfy. There is a sense of kitchen sink in the construction, which may make audiences think twice before investing valuable time in this convoluted premise."

References

External links
 

2022 British television series debuts
2020s British drama television series
British thriller television series
English-language television shows
Amazon Prime Video original programming
Television series by Amazon Studios
Television series by Hartswood Films
Television shows shot in London